According to Catholicism, a venial sin is a lesser sin that does not result in a complete separation from God and eternal damnation in Hell as an unrepented mortal sin would. A venial sin consists in acting as one should not, without the actual incompatibility with the state of grace that a mortal sin implies; they do not break one's friendship with God, but injure it.

Definition 

According to the Catechism of the Catholic Church:

The definition of the word "venial" is "forgivable". An act, when it is not ordered towards that which is good, is considered to be sinful – either venially or mortally. When such an act is venially sinful, it entails subject-matter that is not considered to be "grave". Such an action, even if it is committed with full knowledge and full consent, remains venial, so long as the subject-matter of the act is not serious. If the subject-matter of a given act is "grave", however, the commission of that act may be mortally sinful. Intentional ignorance and "hardness of heart" increase "the voluntary character of a sin". Thus, in discussing the distinction between venial and mortal sin in his Summa Theologica, St. Thomas Aquinas indicated that a venial sin differs from a mortal sin, in the same way that something imperfect differs from something that is perfect.

As such, one can arrive at what kind of sin, for example, was committed, by asking the following three questions:

 Did the act involve a grave matter?
 Was the act committed with full knowledge of the wrongdoing that had been done in the act?
 Was the act done with full consent of the will?

If all three questions are answered in the affirmative, the criteria for a mortal sin have been met. If any one of the three questions is answered in the negative, only the criteria for a venial sin have been met. In cases of doubt regarding any of these three questions, it is assumed that the criteria for a mortal sin were not met.

Each venial sin that one commits adds to the penance that one must do. Penance left undone during life converts to punishment in Purgatory. A venial sin can be left unconfessed so long as there is some purpose of amendment. One receives from the sacrament of reconciliation the grace to help overcome venial, as well as mortal sins. It is recommended that confession of venial sins be made. Venial sins require some kind of penance.

According to the Magisterium, venial sins usually remain venial no matter how many one commits. They cannot "add up" to collectively constitute a mortal sin, but their accumulation does lead to being more vulnerable to committing mortal sin. There are cases where repeat offenses may become a grave matter. For instance, if one were to steal small amounts of property from a particular person, over time one would have stolen enough that it would develop into a serious theft from that person.

In all this, one ought not to take venial sin lightly, especially when committed deliberately. No one without a special grace (generally taken to apply only to the Blessed Virgin Mary)
can avoid even semi-deliberate venial sins entirely (according to the definition of Trent). But one must, to avoid mortal sins, seek (as far as possible) to overcome venial sins. The Magisterium teaches that although a number of venial sins do not themselves add up to a mortal sin, each venial sin weakens the will further, and the more willing one becomes in allowing such falls, the more one is inclined towards, and will inevitably fall into mortal sins if one continues along this path.

See also 
 Contrition
 Perfect contrition
 Original sin
 Catholic hamartiology

References

External links 
 Sin in Catholic Encyclopedia
 The Venial Sin by Honore de Balzac
 Catechism of the Catholic Church – Mortal and Venial Sin

Catholic doctrines
Christian hamartiology
Christian terminology
Sin